Sarah Marie Jeffery (born  3 April 1996) is a Canadian actress, singer, and dancer. She is known for her work on the NBC series Shades of Blue and Disney Channel's Descendants franchise. From 2018 to 2022, she has portrayed the lead role of Maggie Vera on the CW reboot series Charmed.

Early life
Jeffery was born in Vancouver, British Columbia and is of mixed African, Indigenous Canadian, and English descent. Jeffery has been singing, dancing and acting in musicals and theatrical productions since she was three years old.

Career
Jeffery's first major acting role was in the Cartoon Network television film Aliens in the House. Shortly after, she landed a lead role in the DirecTV original series Rogue, working opposite Thandie Newton, playing the role of her daughter, Evie Travis. She subsequently joined the cast of Fox's sci-fi drama series Wayward Pines playing the recurring role of Amy, opposite Matt Dillon and Carla Gugino.

In 2015, Jeffery played the role of Princess Audrey, daughter of Princess Aurora, in the Disney Channel Original Movie, Descendants. She followed this up by playing the role of Audrey in the animated spinoff to the film Descendants: Wicked World. In 2019, she reprised her role as Audrey in the third and final installment of the franchise, Descendants 3.

In January 2016, she began a lead role in Adi Hasak's American police procedural crime series Shades of Blue, playing Cristina Santos, the daughter of Jennifer Lopez's character; the series was renewed for a second season. The same year Jeffery starred in the comedy film Be Somebody with Matthew Espinosa.

In February 2018, Jeffery was cast in the lead role of Maggie Vera in The CW's fantasy drama series Charmed, a reboot of the 1998 series of the same name. The reboot "centers on three sisters in a college town who discover they are witches."

Personal life
In December 2019, Jeffery revealed through Instagram that she struggles with obsessive–compulsive disorder.

Filmography
{| class="wikitable sortable"
|+ Film and television roles
|-
! Year
! Title
! Role
! class="unsortable" | Notes
|-
| 2013
| Aliens in the House
| Katie
| Unsold television pilot
|-
| 2013–2016
| Rogue
| Evie Travis
| Main role (seasons 1–3)
|-
| 2015
| Wayward Pines
| Amy Breslow
| Recurring role (season 1), 6 episodes
|-
| 2015
| Descendants: School of Secrets
| Audrey
| Main role
|-
| 2015
| Descendants
| Audrey
| Disney Channel Original Movie
|-
| 2015–2017
| Descendants: Wicked World
| Audrey
| Main voice role
|-
| 2015
| Across the Line
| Jayme Crawley
| Film; originally titled Undone
|-
| 2016–2018
| Shades of Blue
| Cristina Santos
| Main role (seasons 1–3)
|-
| 2016
| Be Somebody
| Emily Lowe
| Film
|-
| 2018
|The X-Files
| Brianna Stapleton
| Episodes: "Ghouli", "My Struggle IV"
|-
| 2018
| Daphne & Velma
| Daphne Blake
| Direct-to-video film
|-
| 2018–2022
| Charmed
| Maggie Vera
| Main role
|-
| 2019
| Audrey's Royal Return: A Descendants Short Story
| Audrey
| Short film
|-
| 2019
| Descendants 3
| Audrey
| Disney Channel Original Movie
|-
| 2019
| Wicked Woods: A Descendants Halloween Story
|Audrey (voice)
| Animation short film
|-
| 2019
| Robot Chicken
| Prinzessin, Kiki, Old Woman (voice)
| Episode: "Boogie Bardstown in: No Need, I Have Coupons"
|-
| 2020
| The Disney Family Singalong
| Herself
| Television special
|-
| 2021
| Descendants: The Royal Wedding
| Audrey (voice)
| Animated special
|-
| 2023
|Chibiverse
| Audrey (voice)
|Episode: "Chibi Villains Unite"
|-
| TBA
| Six Triple Eight
|
| Filming

Discography

Soundtrack albums

Singles

Other charted songs

Accolades

Notes

References

External links

1996 births
21st-century Canadian actresses
Actresses from Vancouver
Canadian child actresses
Canadian female dancers
Canadian film actresses
Canadian people of African-American descent
Black Canadian actresses
Canadian television actresses
Canadian voice actresses
Canadian people of Indigenous peoples descent
Canadian people of English descent
Living people
People with obsessive–compulsive disorder
Black Canadian dancers